Antares is the only studio album by Chinese rapper and singer Kris Wu, released on November 2, 2018, through Ace Unit Culture Media. The album was preceded by the singles "Deserve" featuring Travis Scott, "Like That", and "Freedom" featuring Jhené Aiko. "Coupe" featuring Rich the Kid was released as an instant grat along with the album pre-order. The songs "Tough Pill" and "Hold Me Down" are the only songs on the album to be featured in both English and Mandarin versions.

Background
Along with the announcement of the album on the Complex radio show Open Late hosted by Peter Rosenberg, Wu stated on the show that he named the album for the star Antares, which means "heart of the scorpion", and in Chinese translates to "heart of the dragon". Wu also set the release date for November 2, four days before his birthday on November 6.

Chart manipulation accusation
Upon release in the United States, seven songs from Antares were in the top ten on the American iTunes Store, blocking songs like Ariana Grande's "Thank U, Next", which was released the following day. Wu was accused by Grande's manager Scooter Braun of using bots to boost his sales numbers. Braun later apologized via an Instagram post, stating after a conversation with Wu, that the irregulation in sales were most likely done through impatient Chinese fans using VPN's to access the album earlier. Antares ultimately debuted at number 100 on the Billboard 200, earning 8,000 album-equivalent units, 5,000 of which were pure sales.

Track listing

Notes
  signifies a co-producer
  signifies an additional producer
 "Hold Me Down" is titled "Hold Me Down – English Version" on digital platforms.
 The Mandarin version of "Hold Me Down" is titled "Hold Me Down – Chinese Version" on digital platforms.

Personnel

Performance
 Kris Wu – main vocals
 Rich the Kid – featured vocals (track 3)
 Jhené Aiko – featured vocals (track 8)
 Travis Scott – featured vocals (track 12)

Production
 Kris Wu – executive production, production (tracks 4, 9, 12–14)
 WondaGurl – production (track 1 and 5)
 Murda Beatz – production (track 2)
 Brian Lee – production (track 2)
 Bryan Nelson – production (tracks 3 and 6)
 Louis Bell – production (tracks 4, 11–14)
 Roofeeo – production (tracks 4 and 13
 Dun Deal – production (track 7)
 P.Kaldone – production (track 7)
 FKi 1st – production (tracks 8 and 10)
 R!O & Kamo – production (track 9)
 Track Bangas – production (track 10)
 Beazy Tymes – production (track 12)
 Frank Dukes – additional production (tracks 1 and 5)
 Rex Kudo – additional production (track 8)
 Smitty – co-production (track 10)

Technical
 Ray Charles Brown Jr. – engineering (tracks 7 and 10), recording (track 8)
 Claudio Cueni – mastering (track 8)
 FKi 1st – mixing (track 8)

Charts

References

2018 albums
Albums produced by FKi (production team)
Albums produced by Frank Dukes
Albums produced by Louis Bell
Albums produced by Murda Beatz
Albums produced by WondaGurl